P.C. Josser is a 1931 British comedy film directed by Milton Rosmer and starring Ernie Lotinga, Robert Douglas and Garry Marsh. It was made by Gainsborough Pictures at the Islington Studios in London. It is sometimes confused with another film Doctor Josser K.C. which was released the same year.

The film is based on a 1926 stage play The Police Force, written by Lotinga himself, about a discharged policeman who is able to prevent dishonesty in the horseracing world.

Cast
 Ernie Lotinga as Jimmy Josser  
 Jack Frost as Nobby  
 Maisie Darrell as Violet Newsome  
 Robert Douglas as Dick Summers 
 Garry Marsh as Carson  
 Max Avieson as Travers

References

Bibliography
 Low, Rachael. Filmmaking in 1930s Britain. George Allen & Unwin, 1985.
 Wood, Linda. British Films, 1927-1939. British Film Institute, 1986.

1931 films
British sports comedy films
1930s sports comedy films
Islington Studios films
Films directed by Milton Rosmer
Films set in England
British horse racing films
British black-and-white films
1930s English-language films
1930s British films